The Club Remixes is a remix album by the American band Selena Gomez & the Scene released on December 21, 2010 via Hollywood Records.

Track listing
"A Year Without Rain" (Dave Audé club remix) – 8:27
"A Year Without Rain" (EK's future classic club mix) – 7:23
"Round & Round" (Dave Audé club remix) – 6:23
"Naturally" (Dave Audé club remix) – 7:43
"A Year Without Rain" (The Alias club remix) – 6:25

Personnel

 Selena Gomez                   – vocals 
 Toby Gad                       – production 
 Kevin Rudolf                   – production 
 Andrew Bolooki                     – production 
 Jeff Halatrax                      – production 
 Antonina Armato                – production 
 Tim James – production 
 Jon Lind                       – vocal production 
 Brian Reeves                       – vocal production 
 Devrim Karaoglu                    – co-production 
 Dave Audé                      – remixing 
 Eric Kupper                    – remixing 
 The Alias                          – remixing

References

2010 remix albums
Albums produced by Rock Mafia
Albums produced by Toby Gad
Hollywood Records compilation albums
Selena Gomez & the Scene albums